James M. Nederlander (March 31, 1922 – July 25, 2016) was an American theatrical producer who served as chairman of the Nederlander Organization, one of the largest operators of live theaters and music venues in the United States. He was a 10-time Tony Award winner and was nominated for 37 Tony Awards.

Early life and education
Nederlander was born in Detroit to a Jewish family, one of six children of Sarah (née Applebaum) and David T. "D.T." Nederlander. His father bought his first live theater in 1905, the Fisher Theater in Detroit (which is no longer owned by the family) and founded the family company, the Nederlander Organization. He has four brothers: Harry, Robert, Fred, and Joseph; and one sister, Frances.

Career
Jimmy was the first of the brothers to go into the family business. He dropped out of the pre-law program at the Detroit Institute of Technology, took a job in the box office of the Lafayette Theater, and then worked as the treasurer in the traveling Air Force production of Moss Hart's Winged Victory which played on Broadway where he made valuable connections. After his father's death in the 1960s, the Nederlander brothers continued to purchase theaters expanding nationally with Jimmy moving to New York City, Harry to San Francisco, and Joey remaining in Detroit. Their largest rivals were the Shubert family, the founders of Broadway theatre district in New York City.  From 1965 to 1985, Jimmy purchased ten theaters in New York City and produced hundreds of plays forming close relationships with producers David Merrick, Alexander H. Cohen, and Emanuel Azenberg. In 1973, Nederlander and his brothers joined with George Steinbrenner as limited partners when Steinbrenner purchased the New York Yankees of Major League Baseball.

The Nederlander Organization controls nine Broadway theaters and is the second largest owner, of the three companies that dominate Broadway after the Shubert Organization (which owns sixteen theaters) and ahead of Jujamcyn (which owns five). The Nederlander Organization owns a larger number of theater houses than the others with an additional fifteen theaters nationwide. They are the only one of the three that is still run by its owners.

Personal life
Nederlander was married twice. His first wife was Barbara Smith with whom he has a son, James L. Nederlander.
In 1969, he married his second wife Charlene Saunders (born 1934).

Broadway in Chicago announced on November 13, 2018, that the Oriental Theater was to be renamed in honor of James, the founder of Broadway In Chicago.  On February 8, 2019 the venue unveiled its newly renovated marquee, vertical blade sign and signage as the James M. Nederlander Theatre.

Awards and nominations

Tony Awards

Drama Desk Awards

See also
James M. Nederlander Theatre

References

External links
Nederlander Producing Company of America

1922 births
2016 deaths
Nederlander Organization
20th-century American Jews
American theatre managers and producers
New York Yankees owners
Detroit Institute of Technology alumni
Nederlander family
Special Tony Award recipients
Tony Award winners
21st-century American Jews